Varla may refer to:

Zubin Varla (born 1970), British actor and singer
Varla Jean Merman, American actor, singer and drag performer